Rispescia, or Santa Maria di Rispescia, is a small town in southern Tuscany, a frazione of the comune of Grosseto, situated about 10 km south-east of the capital, right outside the Natural Park of Maremma, near the frazione of Alberese.

Overview
The small town developed in the course of 20th century, after the complete reclamation of the Maremman plains and the land reform. In the eastern outskirts of the residential area stands the Centre for Environmental Education of Legambiente, where the exhibition of Festambiente is held every month of August.

Main sights
Church of Santa Maria Goretti, built in the early 1950s, it was designed by architect Carlo Boccianti, it was completed in 1953 and consecrated the following year. Between 1989 and 1993 the church has undergone a series of renovations, which have given it its present appearance.
Fontana del Cinghialino (Fountain of the Little Boar), a fountain with the statue of a wild boar, a perfect reproduction of Porcellino by Pietro Tacca. The statue was donated to Rispescia by the city of Florence in 1953.

Bibliography
Aldo Mazzolai, Guida della Maremma. Percorsi tra arte e natura, Le Lettere, Florence, 1997;
Marcella Parisi, Grosseto dentro e fuori porta. L'emozione e il pensiero (Associazione Archeologica Maremmana e Comune di Grosseto), C&P Adver Effigi, Siena, 2001.

See also
Grosseto
Maremma
Alberese
Batignano
Braccagni
Istia d'Ombrone
Marina di Grosseto
Montepescali
Principina a Mare
Principina Terra
Roselle, Italy

External links

Frazioni of Grosseto